Northumberland Park may refer to:

 Northumberland Park, London
 Northumberland Park railway station, a National Rail station in Northumberland Park, London
 Northumberland Park Depot, a London Underground depot in Northumberland Park, London
 Northumberland Park Metro station, a Metro station in North Tyneside, England
 Northumberland Park, Tyne and Wear

See also 

 Northumberland Provincial Park
 Northumberland National Park, the northernmost national park in England
 Northumberland (disambiguation)